Maxime Bourgeois (born 3 February 1991) is a French professional footballer who plays as a winger for Championnat National 2 club Thonon Evian. He is a former France youth international.

Club career

Early career 
Bourgeois began his career, at age 5, playing for his hometown club FC Brunoy. After spending a year at the club, he moved to nearby commune Villecresnes joining ASPTT Villecresnes. Bourgeois performed well at the club and, as a result, drew interest from professional club US Créteil-Lusitanos, who offered the player a spot in their youth academy. After discussing the move, Bourgeois's parents denied the move with efforts to keep the young player close to home. After two more years at Villecresnes, he was allowed move to Créteil. Despite enduring struggles early on at Créteil, Bourgeois became one of the club's most sought after prospects. After two years at the club, he had generated interest from Ligue 1 clubs Paris Saint-Germain, Lille, Strasbourg, and Monaco. He was later spotted by another Ligue 1 club, Auxerre, following a youth tournament. With Auxerre being close to his hometown Brunoy and the club's youth system being nationally recognized, Bourgeois agreed to the move signing a four-year aspirant (youth) contract until the age of 18.

Auxerre 
Bourgeois initially started with the club's under-16 team. His consistent play saw him promoted to the under-18 team for the 2008–09 season. Following the season, he was promoted to the club's CFA team and made his debut on 8 August 2009 playing 59 minutes in a 1–1 draw with Mantes. He scored his first CFA goal on 30 August against La Vitréenne scoring the equalising goal in the 69th minute. The following week, he scored again, this time against Quimper Cornouaille. Auxerre won the match 2–1. Because of his successful play in the reserves, on 16 October, Auxerre manager Jean Fernandez called the player up for their league match against Bordeaux. He didn't feature in the match, but later made the bench against Paris Saint-Germain in November. Bourgeois did make his professional debut in that match appearing as a substitute in the 87th minute for Aurélien Capoue. Auxerre lost the match 1–0.

Later career
Left free by Sedan, Bourgeois moved to Fleury in January 2019. 

In the summer 2019, Bourgeois joined Thonon Evian.

Honours 
Thonon Evian

 Championnat National 3: 2021–22
 Régional 1 Auvergne-Rhône-Alpes: 2019–20

Notes

References

External links
 Auxerre Player Profile
 

1991 births
Living people
People from Sucy-en-Brie
Association football wingers
French footballers
Ligue 1 players
Ligue 2 players
Championnat National 2 players
Championnat National 3 players
Régional 1 players
AJ Auxerre players
LB Châteauroux players
San Francisco Deltas players
Stade Lavallois players
US Créteil-Lusitanos players
Andrézieux-Bouthéon FC players
CS Sedan Ardennes players
FC Fleury 91 players
Thonon Evian Grand Genève F.C. players
France youth international footballers
Footballers from Val-de-Marne